Nicholas Kassis (born 29 November 1988) is a Lebanon international rugby league footballer who plays for the Wentworthville Magpies in the Ron Massey Cup competition.

Playing career 
Kassis scored two tries for the Wentworthville Magpies in their 38–4 victory over the Auburn Warriors in the 2017 Ron Massey Cup grand final.

Kassis played from the interchange bench for Wentworthville in their 2019 Ron Massey Cup grand final victory over St Mary's at Leichhardt Oval.

References

External links
Sea Eagles profile
2017 RLWC profile

1988 births
Living people
Australian rugby league players
Lebanon national rugby league team players
Rugby league second-rows
Rugby league locks
Wentworthville Magpies players